Güngören, also known as Keferbi is a village in the Midyat District of Mardin Province in Turkey. The village is adjacent to an ancient monastery, Mor Gabriel Monastery, only  to the west.

Güngören is populated by Assyrians and by Kurds of the Dermemikan tribe. The village had a population of 169 in 2021.

History 
The village predates the coming of Islam, with a church ("Purple Stefanos Church"), dating to 778 AD. The Dermemikan Kurds settled in the village in the 1700s and came from Doğubayazıt.

Geography
Güngören is surrounded by forest and is situated atop a hill. The village is located in a geographic and cultural region known as Tur Abdin, which is a large, fairly hilly plateau in Southeastern Turkey.

The village is in a region with a continental climate.

Population

References

Villages in Midyat District
Assyrian communities in Turkey
Tur Abdin
Kurdish settlements in Mardin Province